Warren Dunes State Park is a  Michigan state park, located along the eastern shore of Lake Michigan in Berrien County. The park's large sand dunes and lakeshore beaches make it one of the most popular of Michigan’s state parks with an average of about one million visitors annually.

Large sand dunes are found throughout the park. Among the park's dunes are Mt. Fuller, Pikes Peak, and Mt. Edwards, with the most significant being Tower Hill, the highest point in the park, which stands 240 feet (73 meters) above the Lake Michigan. This dune is the one that is most visible to visitors, many of whom delight in scrambling up its slopes and rushing back down again. Easy access to the dunes make it a popular location to practice the sport of sandboarding.

The dunes and beach area was preserved by a local businessman, Edward K. Warren,  who originally purchased the site as a favor to a friend who had encountered significant financial difficulties. By 1930, the Warren Dunes area had been taken over as a state park.

Facilities and activities 

Hiking: The park has six miles of winding trails.
Cross-country skiing
Swimming
Beach House
Picnicking
Picnic Area
Picnic Shelter
Playground
Camping
Concession/Store
Metal Detecting: Metal detecting is permitted in designated areas of the park; however, any found items are subject to review by park staff and may be retained pending further investigation. 
Hunting: Most of the park north of the beach area is open to hunting for part of the year.

Camping 

 Warren Dunes was in the top five most popular camping destinations in the state of Michigan based on Google search traffic. The park contains two main campgrounds: Warren Dunes Modern and Warren Dunes Semi-Modern.  Warren Dunes Modern has almost 200 campsites and is on the inland side of the dunes within walking distance to the beach. Warren Dunes Semi-Modern is rustic and much smaller with only about 30 campsites. It has a variety of campsites, some with high levels of privacy and others that are fairly close together.  Both campgrounds are immensely popular and normally at full capacity in July and August.

Other activities 
Wildlife watching
Skygazing: Clear skies allow viewing of more stars than in most populated areas.
Clay painting: Walking about a mile up the creek which empties into the lake just south of the beach leads to large beds of light gray clay, through which the creek flows. Mixed with the creek water, clay makes body/face paint which can be worn home, but is much more commonly washed off by another swim in the lake.  Clay painting has a negative effect on the park environment due to the amount of clay that is introduced to the creek water through man-made erosion and dispersion.  Clay particles in the water create a  turbid water environment. Turbid water can also have negative health effects if ingested; the higher the turbidity level, the higher the risk that people may develop gastrointestinal diseases.  These health hazards are of particular concern given the number of small children and infants who play in the creek at the lake shore.
Creativity: This park is big and often not crowded, so a great testing ground for beach activities and equipment. For example, it was the inspiration and development site for the Beach Buggy, a self-contained mini-kitchen which could be wheeled to a family's water-side picnic site.

See also 
Grand Mere State Park
Warren Woods State Park
Singing sand

References

External links
Warren Dunes State Park Michigan Department of Natural Resources
Warren Dunes State Park Metal Detecting Map Michigan DNR
Warren Dunes State Park Protected Planet (World Database on Protected Areas) 
Warren Dunes Area Photographs at pbase.com
Warren Dunes Stories Article
Warren Dunes - Way Marked Trails Downloadable GPX

State parks of Michigan
Protected areas of Berrien County, Michigan
Dunes of Michigan
Beaches of Michigan
Lake Michigan
Landforms of Berrien County, Michigan